Drew McDowall (born 28 January 1961) is a Scottish musician who has been a member, collaborator and remixer for various influential music groups. McDowall was formerly a full-time member of Coil.

History
McDowall formed art-punk trio Poems in 1978 with his then-wife, Rose McDowall. During the 1980s, McDowall was a member of Psychic TV. McDowall performed with Coil regularly for several years, becoming an official member in 1994. McDowall currently is a member of the groups CSD (formerly Captain Sons and Daughters) and Compound Eye (with Tres Warren of Psychic Ills). The notoriously reclusive musician, who resides in New York City, has done a number of public performances for the Modular Synthesizer Solstice and Equinox series in Brooklyn, beginning in 2012.

In March 2014, McDowall provided the score to Are You Okay, a short film written by Bret Easton Ellis for the "Are You Okay?" single by Dum Dum Girls.

Discography

Solo
Agalma (Dais Records 2020)
Third Helix (Dais Records 2018)
Unnatural Channel  (Dais Records 2017)
Collapse  (Dais Records 2015)
Haecciety Deluge  (Ascetic House 2015)
"Tongs" as Screwtape on the compilation album Interiors (1998)

Coil
 Coil vs The Eskaton: Nasa Arab (12") (1994)
 Coil vs ELpH: Born Again Pagans (CD) (1994)
 ELpH: pHILM #1 (10") (1994)
ELpH vs. Coil: Worship the Glitch (1995)
Black Light District: A Thousand Lights in a Darkened Room (1996)
Time Machines (1998)
 The Solstice and Equinox Singles:
 Spring Equinox: Moon's Milk or Under an Unquiet Skull (7"/CD) (1998 March)
 Summer Solstice: Bee Stings (7"/CD) (1998 June)
 Autumn Equinox: Amethyst Deceivers (7"/CD) (1998 September)
 Winter Solstice: North (7"/CD) (1999 January)
"Blue Rats (Blue Cheese Remix)" and "Heartworms" with Coil on the compilation album Foxtrot (1998)
Astral Disaster with Coil (1999 January)
Coil: Musick to Play in the Dark Vol. 1
A Guide for Beginners: The Voice of Silver with Coil (2001)
A Guide for Finishers: Golden Hair with Coil (2001)
Coil: 'Moon's Milk (In Four Phases)' (2XCD) (2002 January)

Other collaborations
Les Fluers De Mal with Rabit (Halcyon Veil, 2017)
Nordic Flora Series pt3- Gore Tex City with Varg (Northern Electronics, 2017)
 Love Is The Capital with Hiro Kone (Geographic North, 2017)
Perfect World with Uniform (12XU/Alter, 2015)
Journey from Anywhere LP with Compound Eye (Editions Mego, 2013)
Compound Eye 10" with Compound Eye (The Spring Press, 2013)
The Origin of Silence 12" with Compound Eye (The Spring Press, 2012)
"Seeds of Love" maxi-single with Backworld (Harbinger House, 2003)
Brighter than the Universe/Red Eye 7" with Captain Sons and Daughters (2003)
Godstar: Thee Director's Cut with Psychic TV (Temple Records, 2004)
"Sweet Fang/Greenery" 7" with Captain Sons and Daughters (2006)

Remixes
 Drab Majesty Forget Tomorrow (Dais Records 2017)
 Croatian Amor Love Means Taking Action (Posh Isolation 2016)
"The Snow (As Pure As?)" remix alongside John Balance on The Snow (1991)
 Nine Inch Nails "The Art of Self Destruction, Part One", "The Downward Spiral (The Bottom)", "Eraser (Denial; Realization)", "Eraser (Polite)" and "Erased, Over, Out" remixes alongside Coil on the album Further Down the Spiral (1995)
"Cowboys In Bangkok 1995 (Coil vs Elph Mix)" remix alongside Peter Christopherson on the Chris and Cosey album Twist
Hiro Kone "Severance" (2012)
"Signal I" remix on the Long Distance Poison album Gliese Translations (2013)
Azar Swan "In My Mouth" (2013)

References

External links
Coil

1961 births
Living people
Musicians from Paisley, Renfrewshire
Scottish rock musicians
Coil (band) members